Anne Curtis-Smith(born 17 February 1985) is a Filipino-Australian actress, model, television host, entrepreneur and recording artist. She is dubbed as the "Multimedia Superstar" for her talent and influence.

Curtis has received numerous accolades throughout her career, including two FAMAS Awards, a Luna Award, two Metro Manila Film Festival Awards, and five PMPC Star Awards for Television. Additionally, she has also been nominated for two Gawad Urian Awards, and eight PMPC Star Awards for Movies. Regarded as one of the most influential celebrities in the Philippines, Forbes Asia named her as one of the top 100 digital stars in the Asia-Pacific region. As of 2021, she remains as the Philippines' top Instagram personality with over 17 million followers, and is also the 4th most followed Filipino celebrity on Facebook with over 18 million followers. She was also the first Filipino to reach 14 million followers on Twitter, and is currently the second most followed Filipino celebrity on the platform. Elsewhere, Curtis was also the number one Instagram influencer in United Arab Emirates (UAE).

Curtis has also starred in several films, including the box-office hits Baler (2008), No Other Woman (2011), A Secret Affair (2012), The Gifted (2014), Sid & Aya: Not a Love Story (2018), and The Mall, The Merrier (2019). She is the third highest grossing Filipino actress (9th overall) of the 2010s decade with her films grossing over Php 1.5 billion in box-office receipts. Furthermore, she has since starred in several hit television series, including Hiram (2004–2005), Kampanerang Kuba (2005), Maging Sino Ka Man (2006–2007), Dyosa (2008), Green Rose (2011) and Kailangan Ko'y Ikaw (2013). In 2014, she portrayed the iconic Komiks character Dyesebel in Mars Ravelo's Dyesebel. She is also one of the main host of the noontime variety show It's Showtime (2009–2020, 2022–present).

Early life
Anne Ojales Curtis-Smith was born in Yarrawonga, Victoria, Australia, the daughter of Carmencita Ojales, a Filipino from Bolinao, Pangasinan and James Ernest Curtis-Smith, an Australian lawyer. Her father married Ojales in 1982. Her younger sister, Jasmine, is also an actress. On their father's side, they had a half-sister named Clare who died in 2007 due to a cardiovascular disease at four months old.

Curtis, being half-Filipino, would visit her mother's relatives in the Philippines with her family. In 1997, 12-year-old Curtis was approached by a talent scout to ask if she would like to enter a children's beauty pageant. Her father feared that it was a scam, while her mother wanted her to try it. Without her father's knowledge, Curtis then started to go to different talent agencies. By then, she and her family decided to stay permanently in the Philippines. Curtis could not speak or understand the Filipino language at the time, and so had to take classes.

Career

1997–2004: Early works
In 1997, Curtis had her film debut in Magic Kingdom: Ang Alamat ng Damortis. Afterwards, she signed with Viva Films and GMA Network. Her first television appearance was in the drama series, Ikaw Na Sana. She was also part of the teen-oriented show, T.G.I.S..

From 1998 to 2003, Curtis had a string of minor and supporting roles in films such as Honey, My Love... So Sweet, Ika-13 Kapitulo, Juan & Ted: Wanted and in television shows May Bukas Pa, Beh Bote Nga, Anna Karenina, and Idol Ko si Kap.

2004–2010
In 2004, Curtis moved from GMA Network to ABS-CBN, stating the move "majorly life changing." Her first project with the network was the drama, Hiram, starring Dina Bonnevie and Kris Aquino. Aside from Hiram, Curtis also joined ASAP as a host and as a performer.

Curtis' big break came in 2005, when she played the title role in the fantasy television series Kampanerang Kuba. This marked her first collaboration with director Wenn V. Deramas. Curtis then hosted the reality show Qpids with Luis Manzano, and a segment in the talk show, The Buzz called Wanna Buzz.

In 2006, Curtis joined Luis Manzano as hosts of the second kids season of the reality talent competition, Star Circle Quest. That same year, she starred in the romantic drama All About Love, where she co-starred with John Lloyd Cruz, Bea Alonzo, Luis Manzano, Angelica Panganiban and Jason Abalos, as well as the supernatural horror film, Wag Kang Lilingon with Kristine Hermosa. She portrayed Celine Magsaysay in the drama series Maging Sino Ka Man. She received acclaim for her performance in the series, and received her first acting nomination at the PMPC Star Awards for TV for Best Drama Actress.

In 2007, Curtis reunited with Wenn V. Deramas for the comedy film, Ang Cute Ng Ina Mo. She also co-starred with Oyo Boy Sotto in Sineserye Presents: May Minamahal, and reprised her role of in the second installment of Maging Sino Ka Man, entitled Maging Sino Ka Man: Ang Pagbabalik. Earlier in the year, Curtis also became a video jockey for MTV Philippines.

In 2008, Curtis starred in two romantic dramas; When Love Begins, alongside Aga Muhlach, and the 34th Metro Manila Film Festival official entry, Baler, with Jericho Rosales. For her performance in the latter, she won the Metro Manila Film Festival Award for Best Actress. This marked Curtis' first acting award. She also received Best Actress nominations at the 57th FAMAS Awards, 25th PMPC Star Awards for Movies, 11th Gawad PASADO Awards, and a 27th Luna Awards. Also in 2008, Curtis top-billed the fantasy television series Dyosa, where she played four different characters. Because of the role, she was dubbed as the "Dyosa" of Philippine Show business.

In 2009, Curtis became one of the main hosts of the morning competition program, Showtime! alongside Vhong Navarro, Kim Atienza, and Vice Ganda, and starred in the romantic comedy television series, The Wedding, with Zanjoe Marudo and Derek Ramsay. For her work in Showtime!, she and her co-hosts received a nomination for Best Talent Search Program Host at the 24th PMPC Star Awards for TV.

In 2010, Curtis starred in the romantic comedy film Babe, I Love You. The movie marked her first big-screen team-up with Sam Milby. She also starred in the romantic drama film In Your Eyes, alongside Claudine Barretto and Richard Gutierrez. Her role in the film earned her an award for Best Supporting Actress at the 29th Luna Awards, and a Movie Actress of the Year nomination at the 27th PMPC Star Awards for Movies.

2011–2014
In 2011, Curtis starred in the Philippine adaptation of the Korean drama, Green Rose, with Jericho Rosales. She also top-billed the comedy film Who's That Girl?, which served as her reunion movie with Luis Manzano, and starred in the romantic drama film No Other Woman, with Derek Ramsay and Cristine Reyes. No Other Woman was a box-office success, grossing Php 100 million in five days. It briefly became the highest-grossing Filipino film, before it was eclipsed by The Unkabogable Praybeyt Benjamin, later in the year. For the film's box-office performance, she and her co-star Cristine Reyes were recognized as the Box-Office Queens at the 43rd Box Office Entertainment Awards. Curtis also won the Best Actress awards at the 14th Gawad Pasado Awards, and 60th FAMAS Awards. Furthermore, she received her third Movie Actress of the Year nomination at the 28th PMPC Star Awards for Movies.

In the same year, Curtis also had her first foray into the Philippine music scene. Although a confessed non-singer, Curtis launched her debut studio album, Annebisyosa, under Viva Records, on 25 September 2011. She described the album as "super fun" and "not serious", and jokingly stated that people should listen at their own risk. The album was an instant hit, reaching PARI gold status in less than a month, and platinum status in December of that year.

In 2012, Curtis staged her first solo concert tour, Annebisyosa: No Other Concert World Tour at the Smart Araneta Coliseum, in support of her debut album. The concert was also in celebration of her 15th year in show business. She performed in several local provinces as well as internationally in cities such as Hong Kong and California. For the concert tour, she won the award for Female Concert Performer of the Year at the 44th Box Office Entertainment Awards. Also in 2012, Curtis' morning competition program, Showtime, was reformatted into a noontime variety show, It's Showtime, and replaced Happy Yipee Yehey! in its regular noontime slot. For her work in It's Showtime, she received an award for Best Female TV Host at the 27th PMPC Star Awards for Television. She then starred in the romantic drama A Secret Affair, which earned her a third FAMAS Award for Best Actress nomination.

In 2013, Curtis, along with Kris Aquino and Robin Padilla, led the drama series, Kailangan Ko'y Ikaw.

In 2014, Curtis played the title role in ABS-CBN's adaptation of Mars Ravelo's Dyesebel. She also starred in two films that year; the comedy film The Gifted, with Sam Milby and Cristine Reyes, and the romance thriller, Blood Ransom. The former earned her a fourth nomination for Movie actress of the year at the 31st PMPC Star Awards for Movies. She also released her second studio album, The Forbidden, and had her second solo concert tour, The Forbidden Concert: Annekapal at the Smart Araneta Coliseum.

2015–2017
In 2015, Curtis focused on It's Showtime, and received her second win for Best Female TV Host at the 29th PMPC Star Awards for Television.

In 2016, Curtis became the main host of the reality music competition, I Love OPM, and its spinoff, We Love OPM: The Celebrity Sing-Offs. She also launched her third studio album, Forever Young, during the year.

2018–present
In 2018, she starred in the romantic drama Sid & Aya: Not a Love Story, alongside Dingdong Dantes, and the action thriller Buy Bust. In preparation for her role in the latter, Curtis became a practitioner of Pekiti-Tirsia Kali, a style of Filipino Martial Arts. She received critical acclaim for both films, receiving a rare double nomination for Best Actress at the 42nd Gawad Urian Awards. Also for her work in both films, American publication Variety selected Curtis as one of five Asian talents to be honored with the Asian Star: Up Next award at the Macau Film Festival. Furthermore, her performance in Sid & Aya: Not a Love Story earned her Best Actress nominations at the 37th Luna Awards and the 67th FAMAS Awards, where she was also honored with the FPJ Memorial Award. Later in the year, she also starred in the 44th Metro Manila Film Festival official entry, the horror-thriller film Aurora. For her performance in the film, she received her second nomination for Best Actress at the festival's award ceremony.

In 2019, she starred alongside Marco Gumabao in the erotic romantic drama film Just a Stranger, which became a box-office success. At the 36th PMPC Star Awards for Movies, the pair received a nomination for Movie Love Team of the Year, making it her eighth PMPC Star Awards for Movies nod. Later that year, she starred alongside her It's Showtime co-host, Vice Ganda, in the musical comedy film The Mall, The Merrier, which served as their official entry to the 45th Metro Manila Film Festival. Despite mixed-to-average reviews from critics, the film was a huge box-office success. It grossed Php 323 million, making it one of the highest-grossing Filipino films, and Curtis' highest-grossing film to date. During the year, Curtis also received her fourth win for Best Female TV Host at the 33rd PMPC Star Awards for Television for her work on It's Showtime.

In 2020, Curtis announced a hiatus to focus on her pregnancy and married life.

In 2022, Anne Curtis returned to It's Showtime.

Other ventures

Charitable and philanthropic work 
In March 2015, Curtis became a celebrity advocate for UNICEF Philippines, having been a supporter of the organization since 2009. As an advocate, she visited parts of Leyte that were devastated by Typhoon Yolanda in 2013 to meet with children and families affected by the typhoon and observe recovery operations.

In October 2015, Curtis launched a marathon called the "Heroes for Children Run" to benefit UNICEF's "1,000 Days of Life" campaign.

In 2019, she became UNICEF's National Goodwill Amabassador.

Book 
In February 2016, Curtis launched her first written work, a children's book entitled Anita, The Duckling Diva in collaboration with UNICEF Philippines.

Cosmetics line
In September 2017, Curtis launched her makeup line in the Philippines, BLK cosmetics.

Personal life
In December 2016, Curtis became engaged to her longtime boyfriend, restaurateur and food blogger Erwan Heussaff; they were married on 12 November 2017 in Queenstown, New Zealand. Curtis gave birth to the couple's child, Dahlia Amélie on 2 March 2020. The name "Dahlia" is said to be taken from the name of Curtis' character in her 1997 debut film, Magic Kingdom: Ang Alamat ng Damortis.

Filmography

Film

Television

Discography

Studio albums

Compilation albums

Concerts

Solo Major Concerts

Awards and nominations

Listicles

Notes

References

External links
 

1985 births
Living people
Filipino film actresses
Filipino television actresses
Filipino child actresses
Filipino people of Australian descent
Citizens of the Philippines through descent
Filipino women pop singers
Filipino female models
Australian female models
People from Wangaratta
Filipino television variety show hosts
VJs (media personalities)
GMA Network personalities
ABS-CBN personalities
Viva Artists Agency
Viva Records (Philippines) artists
Star Circle Quest
Ilocano people
20th-century Filipino actresses
21st-century Filipino actresses
Filipino women comedians